Leonid Aleksandrovich Chernishyov (Russian: Леонид Александрович Чернышёв ; (15 May 1875, Sukhobuzim, Yeniseysk Governorate - 1932, Krasnoyarsk) was a Russian and Soviet architect and designer.

Biography 
He was born into a peasant family. His mother was the daughter of a priest. In 1880, they moved from their village to Krasnoyarsk, where his father took work as a scribe. While studying at the gymnasium, he made friends with his classmate, . At that time, an artist named M. A. Rudchenko was lodging with Karatanov's family. He introduced both boys to drawing and painting. These hobbies were encouraged by the artist, Vasily Surikov, who was an old acquaintance of Leonid's family. 

In 1892, on Surikov's advice, he left Krasnoyarsk to enroll at the Moscow School of Painting, Sculpture and Architecture. Under his influence, Leonid decided to devote himself to architecture. He graduated in 1901. Two years later, he continued his education at the Imperial Academy of Arts in Saint Petersburg, under Professor Alexander Pomerantsev. In 1904, he participated in the construction of the Hotel Metropol Moscow and, in 1905, began a tour of Southern Russia to seek inspiration from nature. He returned to Krasnoyarsk in 1906, without completing his studies at the Academy. The following year, he opened a small art school, with the assistance of Surikov.

His first major projects, the House of Merchants and various buildings for the resort at Lake Shira, were performed from 1909 to 1910. In the latter year, Siberia's first drawing school was opened and the Governor of Yeniseysk, appointed him head teacher. His old friend, Karatanov, also became a teacher there.

In 1911, he designed pavilions for the First West Siberian Agricultural and Industrial Exhibition in Omsk. For this work, he received a commission of 11,000 Rubles, which enabled him to build his own home. 

In 1918, he accepted the post of Provincial Engineer. Two years later, after the Soviet takeover, he was transferred to the "Department of State Structures", operated by the Provincial Economic Council, and became head of the Design Bureau. He was also a lecturer in architecture at the Higher Krasnoyarsk Polytechnic and a teacher at the School of the Union of Builders. In 1922, following a major reorganization, he once again became Provincial Engineer. 

He never married and devoted all of his time to work; sometimes as much as twenty hours per day. He was also a heavy smoker. As a result, his health deteriorated and he died of heart failure,  sometime during the first year of the Soviet famine of 1932–33.

References

Further reading 
 Y. E. Grinberg, Л. А. Чернышев — архитектор и строитель здания Красноярского музея (L. A. Chernyshev - architect and builder of the Krasnoyarsk Museum), Красноярское книжное издательство, 1989.

External links 

 Biography @ My Krasnoyarsk
 Autobiography (up to 1925) @ Architectural History, Krasnoyarsk Krai

1875 births
1932 deaths
Russian architects
Soviet architects
People from Yeniseysk Governorate
Moscow School of Painting, Sculpture and Architecture alumni
Imperial Academy of Arts alumni